Jankowskia is a geometer moth genus in the tribe Boarmiini of subfamily Ennominae. The genus was described by Oberthür in 1884.

It includes the following species:
 Jankowskia acuta N. Jiang , D.Y. Xue & H.X. Han, 2010 
 Jankowskia athleta Oberthür, 1884 
 Jankowskia fuscaria fuscaria (Leech, 1891) 
 Jankowskia pseudathleta Sato, 1980 
 Jankowskia bituminaria (Lederer, 1853) (= J. tenebricosa)
 Jankowskia taiwanensis Sato, 1980 
 Jankowskia viidaleppi'' Sato, 1985

The genus is named after Polish naturalist Michał Jankowski.

References

Boarmiini